Cornelia Filipaș (born 1926) was a Romanian Politician (Communist).

She served as Vice-President of The Council of Ministers in 1980-1982, and as Ambassador to Denmark in 1982-1989.

References

1926 births
20th-century Romanian women politicians
20th-century Romanian politicians
Possibly living people
Romanian communists